Ismaila Cheick Coulibaly (born 25 December 2000) is a Malian footballer who plays as a midfielder for EFL Championship club Sheffield United.

Career
On 14 January 2019, Sarpsborg 08 announced the signing of Coulibaly to a four-year contract.

On 9 September 2020, Premier League club Sheffield United announced the signing of Coulibaly and immediately sent him to Belgian First Division A side Beerschot on a three-year loan deal. The loan was terminated after two seasons following Beerschot's relegation from the Belgian top tier.

Coulibaly made his debut for the senior squad of Sheffield United on 7 January 2023 in a FA Cup matchup against Millwall and made his first start on 7 February 2023 in the fourth-round replay win over Wrexham. 4 days later he made his league debut as a late substitute in a 3–0 EFL Championship victory over Swansea City.

Career statistics

Notes

References

2000 births
21st-century Malian people
Living people
Malian footballers
Mali youth international footballers
Association football midfielders
Sarpsborg 08 FF players
Sheffield United F.C. players
K Beerschot VA players
Eliteserien players
Belgian Pro League players
English Football League players
Malian expatriate footballers
Expatriate footballers in Norway
Malian expatriate sportspeople in Norway
Expatriate footballers in Belgium
Malian expatriate sportspeople in Belgium
Expatriate footballers in England
Malian expatriate sportspeople in England